Guilford County is a county located in the U.S. state of North Carolina. As of the 2020 census, the population is 541,299, making it the third-most populous county in North Carolina. The county seat, and largest municipality, is Greensboro. Since 1938, an additional county court has been located in High Point. The county was formed in 1771. Guilford County is included in the Greensboro-High Point, NC Metropolitan Statistical Area, which is also included in the Greensboro-Winston-Salem-High Point, NC Combined Statistical Area.

History

At the time of European encounter, the inhabitants of the area that became Guilford County were a Siouan-speaking people called the Cheraw. Beginning in the 1740s, settlers arrived in the region in search of fertile and affordable land. These first settlers included American Quakers from Pennsylvania, Maryland, and New England at what is now Greensboro, as well as German Reformed and Lutherans in the east, British Quakers in the south and west, and Scotch-Irish Presbyterians in the center of today's Guilford County. As population increased, the North Carolina colonial legislature organized the county in 1771, from parts of Rowan and Orange counties. It was named for Francis North, Earl of Guilford, father of Frederick North, Lord North, British Prime Minister from 1770 to 1782.

Friedens Church, whose name means "peace" in German, is in eastern Guilford County, at 6001 NC Hwy 61 North, northwest of Gibsonville. It is a historic church established by some of the  earliest European settlers in this area. According to a church history, Rev. John Ulrich Giesendanner led his Lutheran congregation from Pennsylvania in 1740 into the part of North Carolina around Haw River, Reedy Fork, Eno River, Alamance Creek, Travis Creek, Beaver Creek, and Deep River. Friedens Church built a log structure in 1745, which the congregation used for 25 years. The second building, completed about 1771, was more substantial and was used for a century, being replaced in May 1871. That third building was destroyed by fire on January 8, 1939, with only the front columns surviving destruction. The church was rebuilt and reopened in May 1939.

The Quaker meeting also played a major role in the European settlement of the county. Numerous Quakers still live in the county. New Garden Friends Meeting, established in 1754 and first affiliated with a Pennsylvania meeting, still operates in Greensboro.

Alamance Presbyterian Church, a log structure, was built in 1762. The congregation was not officially organized until 1764 by the Rev. Henry Patillo, pastor of Hawfields Presbyterian Church. It has operated since then on the same site in present-day Greensboro. According to the church history, the congregation has built five churches on that site and now has its eighteenth pastor.

On March 15, 1781, during the American Revolution (1775-1783), for independence from Great Britain,  the Battle of Guilford Court House was fought just north of present-day Greensboro between Generals Charles Cornwallis and Nathanael Greene. This battle marked a turning point in the Revolutionary War in the South. Although General Cornwallis, the British commander, held the field at the end of the battle, his losses were so severe that he decided to withdraw to the Carolina coastline, where he could receive reinforcements from the British Royal Navy at the port in Wilmington and his battered army could be protected by the British naval power. His decision ultimately led to his leading his finished ravaged army north into
Virginia leading eventually to his defeat and surrender later in October 1781 at Yorktown, Virginia after a long siege, by a combined force of American and French Royal troops and  blockading French Navy warships on the Chesapeake Bay.

In 1779,  the southern third of Guilford County was separated and erected as Randolph County.  In 1785, following the American Revolution, the northern half of its remaining territory was organized as Rockingham County.

In 1808, the town of Greensboro replaced the hamlet of Guilford Court House as the county seat. It was more centrally located, making it a better location for travelers of the time.

The county was the site of early industrial development, namely, the Mt. Hecla Cotton Mill, established in 1818 as one of the earliest cotton mills in the state. First run by water power, the mill was refitted to be powered by steam, and was one of the earliest examples in the state of the use of steam power for manufacturing.

In the antebellum era, many of the county's residents were opposed to slavery, including Lutherans, Quakers and Methodists. The county was a stop on the Underground Railroad, for which volunteers aided refugee slaves en route to freedom in the North. People gave them safe places to stay and often food and clothing. Levi Coffin, among the founders of the "railroad," was a Guilford County native. He is credited with personally helping more than 2,000 slaves escape to freedom before the war.

Guilford College was founded in 1837 as the New Garden Boarding School; its name was changed in 1888 when the academic program was expanded considerably. Guilford is the third-oldest coeducational institution in the country and the oldest such institution in the South. Greensboro College, established by the Methodist Church through a charter secured in 1838, was one of the earliest institutions of higher education for women in the United States. It became coeducational in 1954.

In 1873 Bennett College was founded in the basement of the Warnersville Methodist Episcopal Church (now  St. Matthew's Methodist Church) with 70 African American male and female students. In 1926, the school became a women-only college, as it continues to be today.

In 1891, Greensboro was selected as the home of a land-grant institution for African Americans, the Agricultural and Mechanical College for the Colored Race, now known as North Carolina Agricultural and Technical State University. It was the nation's second college established under the federal Morrill Act of 1890 and was the first state-supported school for people of color in North Carolina.

Also in 1891, the county became home to the state's first and only publicly supported institution of higher learning for women, the State Normal and Industrial School, established in Greensboro especially to train teachers. In 1932, the school joined with the University of North Carolina at Chapel Hill and North Carolina State University in Raleigh to form the Consolidated University of North Carolina; it was renamed as the Woman's College of the University of North Carolina. From the 1930s to the 1960s, the Woman's College was the third-largest women's university in the world. In 1963, the university was changed to a coed institution, and its curriculum was gradually expanded to include graduate work. It is  now known as the University of North Carolina at Greensboro.

Immanuel Lutheran College and Seminary was located on a small campus on East Market Street from 1905 until it closed in 1961. "Lutheran" was founded by white ethnic German Lutherans for black students in 1903 in Concord, at a time when education was racially segregated and blacks had limited access to higher education. When the school moved to the county seat of Greensboro, Lutherans built a large granite main building for it. The school operated a high school, junior college, and seminary under the jurisdiction of the Evangelical Lutheran Synodical Conference of North America.

In 1911, a new county called Piedmont County was proposed, with High Point as its county seat, to be created from Guilford, Davidson and Randolph Counties.  Many people appeared at the courthouse to oppose the plan, vowing to go to the state legislature to protest. The state legislature voted down the plan in February 1911.

In 1960 North Carolina still operated by racial segregation laws, and maintained the disenfranchisement of most black voters established at the end of the 19th century to suppress the Republican Party. Following World War II, African-American veterans and young people heightened their activities in the American civil rights movement. Guilford County was the site of an influential protest in 1960 when four black students from the North Carolina A&T State University in Greensboro started an early sit-in. Known afterwards as the Greensboro Four, the four young men sat at a "whites-only" lunch counter at the Woolworth's store in downtown Greensboro and asked to be served after purchasing items in the store. When refused, they asked why their money was good enough for buying retail items, but not food at the counter. They were arrested, but their action led to many other college students in Greensboro - including white students from Guilford and the Women's College - to sit at the lunch counter in a show of support. The students carried on a regular sit-in and within two months, the sit-in movement spread to 54 cities in nine states; Woolworth's eventually agreed to desegregate its lunch counters, and other restaurants in Southern towns and cities followed suit.

A darker racial incident in 1979 was called the Greensboro massacre. In this incident the predominantly African American Communist Workers Party (CWP) led a march protesting the Ku Klux Klan and other white-supremacist groups through a black neighborhood in southeastern Greensboro. They were attacked and shot at by KKK and American Nazi Party members; five of the Communist Party marchers were killed and seven wounded in the attack. In 1980 the case attracted renewed national attention when the six shooter defendants were found "not guilty" by an all-white jury. None of the people involved in this shooting, from either side, was a citizen of Guilford County; they simply chose the county seat of Greensboro as a rallying point. In 1985 families and friends of the victims won a civil case for damages against the city police department and other officials for failure to protect the African Americans; monies were paid to the Greensboro Justice Center.

Geography

The county is drained, in part, by the Deep and Haw Rivers.

National protected area 
 Guilford Courthouse National Military Park

State and local protected areas/sites 
 Cascades Preserve (part)
 Charlotte Hawkins Brown Museum
 Company Mill Preserve
 Greensboro Arboretum
 Haw River State Park (part)
 Piedmont Environmental Center
 Rich Fork Preserve (part)

Major water bodies 
 Back Creek
 Beaver Creek
 Belews Lake
 Big Alamance Creek
 Buffalo Creek
 Buffalo Lake
 Deep River
 Haw River
 Hickory Creek
 Lake Brandt
 Lake Hggins
 Lake High Point
 Lake Mackintosh
 Lake Townsend
 Little Alamance Creek
 Mears Fork (Haw River tributary)
 Moores Creek (Reedy Fork tributary)
 North Buffalo Creek
 Old Hollow Lake
 Reddicks Creek
 Reedy Fork (Haw River tributary)
 Rock Creek
 South Buffalo Creek
 West Fork Deep River

Adjacent counties
 Rockingham County - north
 Alamance County - east
 Randolph County - south
 Davidson County - southwest
 Forsyth County - west

Major highways
 
 
 
 
 
 
  (Concurrency with US 421)
 
  (To be fully complete by late 2023)

Major infrastructure 
 Amtrak Thruway (High Point Station)
 High Point Station
 J. Douglas Galyon Depot 
 Piedmont Triad International Airport

Demographics

2020 census

As of the 2020 United States census, there were 541,299 people, 206,950 households, and 132,323 families residing in the county.

2010 census
As of the census of 2010, there were 500,879 people, 192,064 households, 63% of which owned their own housing.  The population density was 648 people per square mile (250/km2).  There were 180,391 housing units at an average density of 278 per square mile (107/km2).  The racial makeup of the county was 64.53% White, 29.27% Black or African American, 0.46% Native American, 2.44% Asian, 0.03% Pacific Islander, 1.81% from other races, and 1.45% from two or more races.  3.80% of the population were Hispanic or Latino of any race.

There were 168,667 households, out of which 30.40% had children under the age of 18 living with them, 48.00% were married couples living together, 13.40% had a female householder with no husband present, and 34.90% were non-families. 27.90% of all households were made up of individuals, and 8.30% had someone living alone who was 65 years of age or older.  The average household size was 2.41 and the average family size was 2.96.

In the county, the population was spread out, with 23.70% under the age of 18, 11.00% from 18 to 24, 31.40% from 25 to 44, 22.10% from 45 to 64, and 11.80% who were 65 years of age or older.  The median age was 35 years. For every 100 females, there were 92.00 males.  For every 100 females age 18 and over, there were 88.60 males.

The median income for a household in the county was $42,618, and the median income for a family was $52,638. Males had a median income of $35,940 versus $27,092 for females. The per capita income for the county was $23,340.  About 7.60% of families and 10.60% of the population were below the poverty line, including 13.80% of those under age 18 and 9.90% of those age 65 or over.

Government and politics
Guilford County is a member of the regional Piedmont Triad Council of Governments.

Between 1928 and 2000, Guilford was a near-perfect bellwether, as it voted for the winner of every presidential election but one. The exception was 1960, when Richard Nixon carried it despite his loss to John F. Kennedy. However, it narrowly voted for Democrat John Kerry in 2004 after having voted for Republican George W. Bush in 2000. Like most other urban counties around the country, it has voted for Democrats by wide margins in every subsequent election.

Guilford County Sheriff's Office
The Guilford County Sheriff's Office is the law enforcement agency for Guilford County, headquartered in downtown Greensboro. It provides primary law enforcement services for the unincorporated areas of Guilford County and to municipalities that have not established their own police departments. Three district offices provide patrol, investigative and administrative services to county residents.

The Sheriff's Office supplements the Greensboro and High Point city police departments, having full jurisdiction and ability to provide law enforcement services within both municipalities. The Sheriff's Office maintains detention centers in both Greensboro and High Point, and provides security to the state courthouses in both cities. The Sheriff's Office has approximately 750 employees and is the second largest full service sheriff's office in North Carolina.

The Guilford County Sheriff is elected every four years by county wide ballot. Funded by the Guilford County Board of Commissioners, county government provides some administrative support.

Health and life expectancy
Of 3,142 counties in the United States in 2014, the Institute for Health Metrics and Evaluation ranked Guilford County 1,330 in the average life expectancy at birth of male residents and 1,434 in the life expectancy of female residents. Males in Guilford County lived an average of 76.1 years and females lived an average of 80.6 years compared to the national average for life expectancy of 76.7 for males and 81.5 for females. In the 1980-2014 period, the average life expectancy in Guilford County for females increased by 4.0 years, while male life expectancy increased by 6.7 years compared to the national average for the same period of an increased life expectancy of 3.1 years for women and 5.5 years for men.

In 2020, the Robert Wood Johnson Foundation ranked Guilford country as 23rd of 100 ranked counties in North Carolina in "health outcomes," as measured by length and quality of life.

Communities

Cities
 Archdale (part)
 Burlington (part)
 Greensboro (county seat and largest city)
 High Point (part)

Towns

 Gibsonville (part)
 Jamestown
 Kernersville (part)
 Oak Ridge
 Pleasant Garden
 Sedalia
 Stokesdale
 Summerfield
 Whitsett

Townships

 Bruce
 Center Grove
 Clay
 Deep River
 Fentress
 Friendship
 Gilmer
 Greene
 Jefferson
 Madison
 Monroe
 Morehead
 Rock Creek
 Sumner
 Washington

Census-designated places
 Forest Oaks
 McLeansville

Unincorporated communities
 Browns Summit
 Climax
 Colfax
 Julian
 Monticello

Populated Places
 Ellisboro
 Gibsonville
 Guilford
 Kimesville
 Ossipee

Notable people
 Mark Robinson (born 1968), 35th Lieutenant Governor of North Carolina (2021–)
 Joseph Cannon (1836–1926), 35th Speaker of the United States House of Representatives (1903–1911)
 Edward R. Murrow, American broadcast journalist
 Dolley Madison, wife of President James Madison and the fourth First Lady of the United States.
 William Sydney Porter, short-story writer better-known as "O. Henry"; his most famous story is "The Ransom of Red Chief".
 Levi Coffin, abolitionist leader who was nicknamed the "President of the Underground Railroad" for helping escaped slaves to freedom in the North before the Civil War.
 Mike Causey 11th Insurance Commissioner of North Carolina, (2017-)

See also
 List of counties in North Carolina
 National Register of Historic Places listings in Guilford County, North Carolina
 USS Guilford (APA-112)
 North Carolina State Parks
 List of future Interstate Highways

References

External links

 
 
 NCGenWeb Guilford County - free genealogy resources for the county

 
Populated places on the Underground Railroad
1771 establishments in North Carolina
Populated places established in 1771
Majority-minority counties in North Carolina